The Dubuque station of Dubuque, Iowa originally served the Illinois Central Railroad. In 1917, the site was considered for creating a Union station in Dubuque. However, no such plan transpired and each railroad continued to use separate depots. Over the years, the station hosted the Illinois Central's Hawkeye, Iowan, and Land O'Corn trains. Passenger service ceased upon the formation of Amtrak in 1971, but resumed between Chicago and Dubuque in 1974 under the name Black Hawk. Service ceased on September 30, 1981. The depot no longer exists, however the old Chicago, Burlington and Quincy Railroad depot still stands to the north.

See Also
 Dubuque Intermodal Transportation Center

References

External links
Dubuque, Iowa– TrainWeb
Library of Congress historical photos

Former Illinois Central Railroad stations
1974 establishments in Iowa
Railway stations closed in 1971
Railway stations in the United States opened in 1974
Railway stations closed in 1981
1971 disestablishments in Iowa
1981 disestablishments in the United States
Former Amtrak stations in Iowa